Gippsland North (North Gipps Land or North Gippsland until 1889) was an electoral district of the Legislative Assembly in the Australian state of Victoria located in northern Gippsland from 1859 to 1955.

In 1859, the Electoral district of Gippsland was abolished and new districts of Electoral district of North Gipps Land and South Gipps Land were created. 
The district of North Gipps Land was defined in the Victorian Electoral Act, 1858 as:

Members
One member initially, two from 1877, One member again from 1889 when the new Electoral district of Gippsland Central was created.

Election Auditors 
John Lightfoot Esquire, a resident of Sale, was re-appointed as the Election Auditor for the district of North Gipps Land in July 1859.

Elections
At the 1859 election for North Gipps Land, Mr Boyd Cuninghame nominated Mr Johnson of Mewburn Park. Mr Johnson was a long time resident and his political views were well known. The nomination was seconded by Mr P. McArdell. No other candidate was nominated and therefore Mr Johnson was duly declared elected.

Notes
 = by-election
 = disqualified
 = expelled

References

Former electoral districts of Victoria (Australia)
1859 establishments in Australia
1955 disestablishments in Australia
Gippsland (region)